U.S. Baseball Park (formerly known as Price Cutter Park) is a baseball park in Christian County, Missouri. It is located off U.S. Route 65 just north of Ozark, Missouri, and south of Missouri's third-largest city, Springfield.

History 

The facility was built in four months in early 1999 and was originally named after a local supermarket company. It opened on July 10, 1999, hosting a game of the Texas–Louisiana League, an independent baseball league.

The playing surface was rededicated as John Pittman Field in 2009, named for a primary designer of the ballpark.

Professional baseball
The ballpark was home to the Springfield/Ozark Mountain Ducks team that was part of several independent leagues (the Texas–Louisiana League, Central Baseball League and, in their final year, the Frontier League when they were known as the Springfield/Ozark Ducks). The Ducks discontinued playing in 2004 after the El Paso Diablos of the Double-A Texas League within Minor League Baseball relocated to become the Springfield Cardinals, playing their home games at Hammons Field in downtown Springfield.

College baseball
The Southwest Missouri State Bears baseball team played select games at the facility starting in April 2000. Ryan Howard was one of the Bears who played at the ballpark. In 2003, the Bears moved from Price Cutter Park to the new Hammons Field in downtown Springfield.

In June 2006, organized baseball returned briefly to the stadium with the Ozark Generals of the M.I.N.K. Collegiate Baseball League.

Youth baseball
In 2009, the Springfield Metro Baseball league moved into the stadium and began play. The open registration league operated in the park with 19 & under, 15 & under, and 12 & under divisions through 2014. Players registered starting each January and new teams are drafted each year in April. The summer season ran from mid-May through the end of July. There was also a fall league which operated on weekends in September and October. The league's annual ceremonies in May had been host to a number of former Major League Baseball (MLB) players including Jack Clark, Willie Wilson, and others. Every third year (2011, 2014) the league ran a unique "retro" season with all the teams outfitted as MLB teams of the past including teams like the St. Louis Browns, Kansas City Athletics, and Washington Senators. The 2014 season was the first where the league operated entirely with wooden bats only. Just prior to the beginning of the 2015 season, the league was informed that the ballpark ownership and the city of Ozark were negotiating with fledgling semi-pro baseball leagues, and Springfield Metro Baseball relocated to ballparks on the near west side of Springfield (Barnhouse & Optimist Fields). No baseball ended up taking place at Price Cutter Park in 2015.

Revival
In 2016, the facility was purchased by U.S. Baseball, who became the owner and operator. They invested $2 million to renovate the ballpark, including a new artificial surface, a new scoreboard, and upgraded concessions and press box.

Renamed as U.S. Baseball Park, the facility again began hosting some college baseball games, starting with a contest between Drury University and William Jewell College in April. U.S. Baseball also used the ballpark to host the Show Me League, a four-team collegiate wooden-bat summer league. The facility also hosts Missouri high school state tournaments, and is used by the Queen City Crush, a team in the Fellowship of Christian Athletes baseball league.

, the ballpark serves as the home field of the Drury Panthers baseball team.

References

External links
 
 Price Cutter Park at Charlie's Ballparks via Wayback Machine
 US Baseball Park at Ballpark Brothers

Minor league baseball venues
Sports venues in Missouri
Baseball venues in Missouri
Sports venues completed in 1999
Buildings and structures in Christian County, Missouri
1999 establishments in Missouri